Heal Our Land is a live album from the contemporary worship band Planetshakers. Planetshakers Ministries International, Integrity and Columbia released the album on April 10, 2012. The album was recorded in the Hisense Arena, Melbourne, Australia.

Critical reception

Stephen Luff, in a nine out of ten review from Cross Rhythms, describes the album as "infectious worship with a driving beat and an anthem audience response. An outstanding worship package."

Rating the album one stars for Jesus Freak Hideout, Scott Fryberger says, "These are the songs that, for the people in attendance for this recording, provided the more intimate moments of worship."

In a one star review from Indie Vision Music, Jonathan Andre states, "Despite the worshipful nature of the music, it becomes very disheartening with bands like this to listen as a music fan and literally wonder which of the songs are covers and which are originals."

Track listing

Chart performance

References

2012 live albums
Planetshakers albums